July 8 - Eastern Orthodox Church calendar - July 10

All fixed commemorations below are celebrated on July 22 by Old Calendar.

For July 9, Orthodox churches on the Old Calendar commemorate the saints listed on June 26.

Saints
 Hieromartyr Pancratius, Bishop of Taormina in Sicily (1st century)
 Hieromartyr Cyril, Bishop of Gortyna in Crete (c. 303)  (see also: September 6, June 14)
 Martyrs Andreas and Probus, by fire.
 Monkmartyrs Patermuthius and Coprius, and Martyr Alexander the Soldier, of Egypt (361-363)  (see also: December 17)
 Saints Patermuthius and Coprius, ascetics, of Egypt (4th century)
 Saint Theodore of Edessa (Theodore the Savvaitis), Bishop of Edessa (848)
 Saint Theodosius, Stylite, of Edessa (9th century)
 Venerable Photius, founder of Akapniou Monastery in Thessaloniki (10th century)

Pre-Schism Western saints
 Saints Anatolia and Audax, martyrs in Rome under Decius (c. 250) 
 Saint Brictius, Bishop of Martola near Spoleto in Umbria in Italy (c. 312) 
 Saint Agrippinus of Autun, Bishop of Autun in France, he ordained St Germanus of Paris to the deaconate and the priesthood (538)
 Hieromartyrs at Wurzburg: Killian, Bishop in East Franconia and Thuringia, and his companions Hieromonk Colman and Hierodeacon Totman (689)  (see also: July 8 )
 Saint Golvinus (Golwen), Bishop of St Pol-de-Léon (Quimper) in Brittany (7th century) 
 Saint Everilda (Everildis, Averil), Abbess of a monastery at Everingham in Yorkshire, Northumbria (c. 700) 
 Saint Agilulfus of Cologne, a monk and Abbot of Stavelot-Malmédy in Belgium, and Archbishop of Cologne in Germany (c. 750) 
 Saint Justus of Poland, one of four hermit-brothers in Poland - Sts Benedict, Andrew, Barnabas and Justus (1008)

Post-Schism Orthodox saints
 Saint Euthymius the Enlightener of Karelia (1435)
 Hieromartyr Peter, Priest, of Cherevkov, Vologda (early 17th century)
 Venerables Dionysius the Rhetorician (1606) and Metrophanes (17th century), of Little St. Anne’s Skete, Mount Athos.

New martyrs and confessors
 New Martyr Michael Paknanas the Gardener, of Athens (1770)
 New Hieromartyr Methodius, Bishop of Lappa on Crete (1793)
 New Hieromartyr Constantine Lebedev, Priest (1918)

Other commemorations
 Commemoration of the consecration of the church of Church of St. Mary of the Spring (Zoödochos Pege) in Constantinople (559)
 Icon of the Mother of God of Cyprus (392), in the village of Stromyn near Moscow.  (see also: April 20 )
 Icon of the Mother of God of Koloch (1413)
 Uncovering of the relics of St. Gabriel, Archimandrite of St. Elias Skete, Mt. Athos (1994) 
 Repose of Righteous Patermuphy of Valaam and St. Alexander Nevsky Lavra (c. 1825)
 Repose of Hierodeacon Melchizedek of the Roslavl Forests (1840)
 Repose of Priest Ilie Lacatusu of Romania (1983)

Icon gallery

Notes

References

Sources
 July 9/July 22. Orthodox Calendar (PRAVOSLAVIE.RU).
 July 22 / July 9. HOLY TRINITY RUSSIAN ORTHODOX CHURCH (A parish of the Patriarchate of Moscow).
 July 9. OCA - The Lives of the Saints.
 July 9. The Year of Our Salvation - Holy Transfiguration Monastery, Brookline, Massachusetts. 
 The Autonomous Orthodox Metropolia of Western Europe and the Americas (ROCOR). St. Hilarion Calendar of Saints for the year of our Lord 2004. St. Hilarion Press (Austin, TX). pp. 50–51.
 The Ninth Day of the Month of July. Orthodoxy in China.
 July 9. Latin Saints of the Orthodox Patriarchate of Rome.
 The Roman Martyrology. Transl. by the Archbishop of Baltimore. Last Edition, According to the Copy Printed at Rome in 1914. Revised Edition, with the Imprimatur of His Eminence Cardinal Gibbons. Baltimore: John Murphy Company, 1916. pp. 200–201.
 Rev. Richard Stanton. A Menology of England and Wales, or, Brief Memorials of the Ancient British and English Saints Arranged According to the Calendar, Together with the Martyrs of the 16th and 17th Centuries. London: Burns & Oates, 1892. pp. 328–329.
Greek Sources
 Great Synaxaristes:  9 ΙΟΥΛΙΟΥ. ΜΕΓΑΣ ΣΥΝΑΞΑΡΙΣΤΗΣ.
  Συναξαριστής. 9 Ιουλίου. ECCLESIA.GR. (H ΕΚΚΛΗΣΙΑ ΤΗΣ ΕΛΛΑΔΟΣ). 
  ΙΟΥΛΙΟΣ. Αποστολική Διακονία της Εκκλησίας της Ελλάδος (Apostoliki Diakonia of the Church of Greece).
  09/07/2018. Ορθόδοξος Συναξαριστής. 
Russian Sources
  22 июля (9 июля). Православная Энциклопедия под редакцией Патриарха Московского и всея Руси Кирилла (электронная версия). (Orthodox Encyclopedia - Pravenc.ru).
  9 июля по старому стилю / 22 июля по новому стилю. СПЖ "Союз православных журналистов". 2018.
  9 июля (ст.ст.) 22 июля 2014 (нов. ст.). Русская Православная Церковь Отдел внешних церковных связей. (DECR).

July in the Eastern Orthodox calendar